Providence Academy may refer to:

Providence Academy (Plymouth, Minnesota), American school
Providence Academy (La Crosse, Wisconsin), American school
 Providence Academy (Johnson City,  Tennessee),  American school

See also
Providence School, a private school in Jacksonville, Florida